Sabina Nowak (married name Pierużek-Nowak; born 6 June 1959) is a Polish scientist and wolf expert. She is president of the Association for Nature Wolf (AfN Wolf) and a member of the Large Carnivore Initiative for Europe.

Life 
In 1983, Nowak graduated from the University of Silesia in Katowice with a Master of Science degree in biology. In her doctoral thesis she described the "Ecology of Wolves". She has been taking care of the wolf in Poland since the mid-1990s. From 1993 to 1998 she coordinated the campaign "For the full protection of the large predators, wolf and lynx" in Poland and a campaign for the protection of the entire Polish part of the primeval forest Białowieża as a national park (Białowieża National Park). In 1998 she was elected to the Ashoka Fellowship. From 2001 to 2004 she was head of the Polish census of lynxes and wolves. Since 2000, she has been coordinating German-Polish cooperation on wolves with the German wolf experts Ilka Reinhardt and Gesa Kluth. From 2009 to 2016 she was a member of the Polish State Council for Nature Conservation, where she chaired the Animals Commission from 2014 to 2016.

2015 Sabina Nowak and Henryk Okarma were speakers at a conference in the Senate "The Future of the Wolf in Poland" concerning the fast growing wolf population in Poland..

Publications 

 National Strategy for Wolf Protection and Management. 1998
 Instructions for Livestock Owners - Methods for Livestock Protection against Wolf Attacks. 1999
 On the trail of the wolves. 2000
 Current report - Wolf and lynx censuses in Polish forests and national parks. 2001
 Sabina Nowak, Robert W. Mysłajek: Wolf Protection in Poland. The Wolf Conservation Association, Godziszka, 2002, 
 Sabina Nowak, Robert W. Mysłajek: Livestock Guarding Dogs in the Western Part of the Polish Carpathians
 Sabina Nowak, Robert W. Mysłajek, Bogumiła Jędrzejewska: Patterns of wolf Canis lupus predation on wild and domestic ungulates in the Western Carpathian Mountains (S Poland)
 Wlodzimierz Jedrzejewski, Sabina Nowak, Robert W. Mysłajek: Animals and roads. Methods of mitigating the negative impact of roads on wildlife
 Maciej Szewczyk, Sabina Nowak et al.: Dynamic range expansion leads to establishment of a new, genetically distinct wolf population in Central Europe
 Sabina Nowak, Robert Mysłajek: Wolves in Western Poland Distribution and Ecology of the Animal Species Faculty of Biology, University of Warsaw, 2017.

External links 
 Sabina Nowak Talk on video: From the carnivore journal

References 

1959 births
Polish biologists
Living people